Vojtěch Machek (born 28 February 1990) is a Czech professional footballer who plays FK Ostrov.

Career
Machek began his career in the youth team of Sparta Prague before moving to Feyenoord, and made his professional debut on loan at Excelsior during the 2009-10 season. The defender played during the 2010/2011 season six games for Helmond Sport.

After a spell at German club SV Poppenreuth in the 2020-21 season, Machek returned to the Czech Republic and joined FK Ostrov in the summer 2021.

References

External links
 

1990 births
Living people
Czech footballers
Czech expatriate footballers
Eerste Divisie players
Czech National Football League players
AC Sparta Prague players
Feyenoord players
Excelsior Rotterdam players
Helmond Sport players
FK Baník Sokolov players
Expatriate footballers in the Netherlands
Expatriate footballers in Germany
Czech expatriate sportspeople in the Netherlands
Czech expatriate sportspeople in Germany
Sportspeople from Ostrava
Association football defenders